James Gowans (born 13 March 1977) is an Australian rules footballer who played for St Kilda in the Australian Football League (AFL).

Recruited from Werribee, Gowans only made four appearances with the St Kilda senior side, mostly as a half forward flanker.

In 2000 he joined his twin brother Chris at Central District. He has participated in all of the club's nine SANFL premierships and won the Jack Oatey Medal when they claimed their first flag in 2000. He also won a Bob Quinn Medal in 2002 and the Central District 'Best and Fairest' award the following year.

References

Holmesby, Russell and Main, Jim (2007). The Encyclopedia of AFL Footballers. 7th ed. Melbourne: Bas Publishing.

1977 births
Living people
St Kilda Football Club players
Central District Football Club players
Werribee Football Club players
Australian rules footballers from Victoria (Australia)
South Australian Football Hall of Fame inductees
Australian twins
Twin sportspeople